The "Grenade, Hand, Anti-Tank No. 74", commonly known as the S.T. grenade or simply sticky bomb, was a British hand grenade designed and produced during the Second World War. The grenade was one of a number of  anti-tank weapons developed for use by the British Army and Home Guard after the loss of many anti-tank guns in France after the Dunkirk evacuation.

Designed by a team from MIR(c) including Major Millis Jefferis and Stuart Macrae, the grenade consisted of a glass sphere containing an explosive made of nitroglycerin and additives which added stability to the compound. The compound was designed to contact the target before exploding. This form of detonation would concentrate on a small area, favouring the rupture of a thick armour plate rather than a general and diffuse explosion. The charge was covered in a strong adhesive and surrounded by a sheet-metal casing. When the user pulled a pin on the handle of the grenade, the casing would fall away and expose the sticky sphere. Pulling another pin would arm the firing mechanism and the user would then attempt to attach the grenade to an enemy tank or other vehicle. Letting go of the handle would release a lever that would activate a five-second fuse, which would then detonate the nitroglycerin compound.

The grenade had several faults in its design. In tests, it failed to adhere to dusty or muddy tanks and if the user was not careful after freeing the grenade from its casing, it could easily stick to their uniform. The Ordnance Board of the War Department did not approve the grenade for use by the British Army, but intervention by the prime minister, Winston Churchill, led to production of the grenade. Between 1940 and 1943, approximately 2.5 million were produced. It was primarily issued to the Home Guard but was also used by British and Commonwealth forces in North Africa. It was used by Allied Forces on the Anzio Beachhead, including the First Special Service Force; as well as by Australian Army units during the New Guinea campaign. The French Resistance were also issued a quantity of the grenades.

Development

In 1938, Maj. Millis Jefferis developed an anti-tank weapon that would be ideal for irregular warfare. It would have an explosive charge deform so that it had a substantial area of intimate contact with the surface of the target. Then, when detonated, the effect of the explosion would be focused on a small area and would rupture an armoured plate. 

Sappers call such a device a "poultice" or "squash head" charge. Jefferis enlisted Bauer and Schulman of the Colloid Science Department of Cambridge University, they experimented with lengths of bicycle inner tube filled with plasticine to represent the explosive. These were fitted with wooden handles and dipped in rubber solution to make them sticky. In experiments, these prototypes proved difficult to aim and only stuck to the metal bins used to represent tanks.

With the end of the Battle of France and the evacuation of the British Expeditionary Force from the port of Dunkirk between 26 May and 4 June 1940, a German invasion of Great Britain seemed likely. However, the British Army was not well equipped to defend the country in such an event; in the weeks after the Dunkirk evacuation it could only field twenty-seven divisions. The army was particularly short of anti-tank guns, 840 of which had been left behind in France and only 167 were available in Britain; ammunition was so scarce for the remaining guns that regulations forbid even a single round being used for training purposes.

Under the circumstances, Jefferis considered that his idea might have more general application for the British Army and the Home Guard. The problem of designing a sticky bomb was delegated to Robert Stuart Macrae.
 
Some sort of flexible bag was required to contain an explosive gel so that it did not matter how the bomb landed on the target. However, a flexible bag was found to be difficult to throw and trials had not been satisfactory. Discussions of the problem in Macrae's office were overheard by Gordon Norwood, a master printer who Macrae had recruited from his former magazine publishing employer, but he was not directly working on the weapon. Norwood suggested that what was needed was a frangible container. He obtained a 150 W light bulb with which to demonstrate his point: a spherical glass flask inside a sock of woven wool, rigid when thrown, but on contact the glass broke and the bomb deformed to the required shape. Experiments with glass flasks filled with cold porridge confirmed that this was the way to go.

The grenade needed a delay for the thrower to get clear, so the woollen sock was covered in a sticky substance ensuring that the bomb stayed in place for a few seconds before detonating. Having covered the bomb in glue, a non-sticky handle was required. In the handle, a delay fuse was ignited by releasing a sprung lever so that a five second time delay started as the grenade left the thrower's hand (just like the levers found on a conventional Mills bomb type hand grenade).

Macrae's tin of birdlime was labelled with a large letter K and an indication that tin came from Stockport but with no more clues as to the manufacturer. Macrae got on a train to Stockport and there found a taxi driver who took him to Kay Brothers Ltd. The company's chief chemist was soon working on the problem of a suitable adhesive and within a matter of weeks the problem was solved to Macrae's satisfaction.

The filling for the bomb was developed by ICI. It was nitroglycerin-based with a variety of additives to make it more stable and viscous.

The adhesive surface was protected by a light metal case which was released by pulling a safety pin: the case fell away as two hemispheres connected by a sprung hinge. The inside of the case was fitted with a number of rubber spikes that kept it clear of the glued surface of the grenade. Early models also had a strip of adhesive tape round the neck of the casing.

Development continued, but there were problems with service regulations that were not written with such an unconventional weapon in mind. The sticky bomb was inevitably rather fragile and even a specially designed box could not fully meet the army's demanding requirements for withstanding rough handling without damage. It seemed there were problems at every turn. The prime minister, Winston Churchill, who was concerned with the state of the country's anti-tank defences, learnt about the grenade and urged its development.

The Ordnance Board of the War Office did not approve the grenade to be used by the army. However, Churchill ordered further tests to be conducted in July, and after personally viewing a demonstration of the grenade ordered that it immediately be put into production. His memo of October 1940 simply read "Sticky bomb. Make one million". A couple of days later, Anthony Eden, then secretary of state for war, added a scribbled note to a cabinet minute that recorded the order to go ahead with the bomb:

In spite of top level pressure, the arguments rumbled on. Trials were disappointing, it was not possible to get the bomb to adhere to any surface that was wet or covered with even the thinnest film of dried mud "a customary condition of tanks" as Major-General Ismay, on 27 June, pointed out.

Churchill was not amused:

Macrae, Ismay and Churchill all saw fit to record these arguments over the technical issue of stickiness. As Eden had pointed out, there was a lot at stake. The British infantry and Home Guard had little with which to put up a fight against tanks and to any who had witnessed trials of Molotov cocktails and SIP grenades it was evident that they could do little to a modern tank other than to provide a blinding pall of smoke. What was needed was a hand weapon to deliver a coup de grâce by punching through the armoured plate. The sticky bomb could do the job and little else was available.

In his memoirs, Ismay recalled that he never solved the puzzle of how to convey his very genuine concerns of the time to the right people.

Churchill considered any obstruction, however well-meaning, as singularly lacking in imagination. In the event of invasion, he foresaw a desperate fight to the last and after the war, he wrote about how he envisaged the use of the sticky bomb, "We had the picture in mind that devoted soldiers or civilians would run close up to the tank and even thrust the bomb upon it, though its explosion cost them their lives. There were undoubtedly many who would have done it". He also later recorded how he intended to use the slogan "You can always take one with you".

Arguments rumbled on and there were endless delays. Early versions of the sticky bomb were prone to leaks as well as breakage in transport. There were understandable concerns over the explosive charge, pure nitroglycerin is notoriously susceptible to the slightest knock but the mixture developed by ICI proved to be very safe even if it should get into the hinges of the storage boxes. By December 1940, fewer than 66,000 had been produced and the rate of production was disappointing at five to ten thousand per week. It was suggested that the original order of one million be reduced to 200,000. Minor improvements to the design were made, of which the most significant was to replace the glass flask with plastic. Finally, after passing all the required tests, the sticky bomb – now the No. 74 grenade Mk II – was accepted by the Ordnance Board; it was put into full-scale production and it became a service issue.

On 14 May 1941, Lieutenant-General Sir Ian Jacob reflected:

Between 1940 and 1943 approximately 2.5 million were produced.

Design

The sphere was covered in stockinette which was coated with a liberal amount of birdlime, an extremely adhesive substance from which the nickname 'sticky bomb' was derived. A casing made out of thin sheet-metal and formed of two halves, was placed around the sphere and held in place by a wooden handle, inside which was a five-second fuse. The handle also contained two pins and a lever; the first pin was pulled out to make the casing fall away and the second to activate the firing mechanism in the grenade. This primed the grenade, with the lever being held down to ensure the fuse was not triggered; then the user would run up to the tank and stick the grenade to its hull, using as much force as possible to break the sphere and spread the nitroglycerin onto the hull in a thick paste. Another alternative was for the user to throw it at the tank from a distance. Either way, the lever would be released and the fuse activated and the grenade would then detonate.

The grenade did possess several problems with its design. Users were urged to actually run up to the tank and place it by hand, rather than throw it, thus the adhesive could very easily stick to their uniform in the process; the user would then be placed in the unenviable situation of attempting to pry the grenade loose whilst still holding onto the lever. It was also discovered that as time passed the nitroglycerin began to deteriorate and become unstable, which made it even more difficult to use. As the grenade was a short-range weapon, users were trained to hide in a trench or other place of concealment until the tank went past them, and then to stick the grenade to the rear of the tank, where its armour was thinnest. Users were relatively safe from a few yards away, as long as they were not in line with the handle when it detonated. The Mark II design used a plastic casing instead of glass, and a detonator instead of a cap.

Operational use

According to a War Office training pamphlet dated 29 August 1940, the sticky bomb should be regarded as a portable demolition device which can be "quickly and easily applied". It was reckoned to be effective against armour of up to  thickness and was suitable for use against "baby" tanks, armoured cars and the vulnerable points on medium and heavy tanks. The safest and easiest application was simply to drop it from an upstairs window; otherwise, it could be used in an ambush of mobile tanks moving along a narrow road or in an attack on tanks parked up for the night.

The sticky bomb could be either thrown or applied in place by hand, in the latter case, the advice was to use sufficient force to break the glass thereby creating a greater area of contact resulting in a more effective explosion. Finally, there was also the option of placing the bomb first and then pulling out the pin at a safe distance by means of a length of string.

Macrae credits the Australian Army with developing the technique of applying a sticky bomb directly onto a tank instead of throwing it from a relatively safe distance. Since the bomb used a blast effect, it was safe to do this and walk away provided only that the bomb's handle was pointing away from the bomber – the handle would be shot away from the explosion "like a bullet." Macrae gives no date for the development of this tactic. Macrae confirmed that placing the bomb rather than throwing it gives better adhesion and allows thicker plates to be penetrated.

By July 1941, 215,000 sticky bombs had been produced. Of these, nearly 90,000 had been sent abroad to North and South Africa, the Middle East and to Greece where they did useful service. The remainder were stored at Ordnance Depots or distributed to army and Home Guard units.

The grenade was first issued in 1940 to Home Guard units, who appeared to have taken a liking to it despite its flaws. Although the Ordnance Board had not approved the grenade to be used by regular army units, a quantity were provided for training purposes. However, a number of sticky bombs did find their way to British and Commonwealth units participating in the campaign in North Africa, and were used as anti-tank weapons. During the Afrika Korps advance towards the town of Thala in February 1943, they accounted for six German tanks.

They were also issued to units of the Australian Army, who used them during the Battle of Wau and the Battle of Milne Bay. They were used by various allied units on the Anzio Beachhead, namely the First Special Service Force, who obtained them from the British. A large number were also supplied to the French Resistance.

Recognition
In 1947, the Royal Commission on Awards to Inventors considered claims from Macrae and from the managing director of Kay Brothers. Macrae's legal representative was Edward Terrell – himself a wartime inventor. At the time the crown opposed granting an award; when Macrae was asked what elements of the sticky bomb he claimed to have invented, he replied "I am claiming no invention; I merely claim the development of the bomb, which was my job." However, in 1951, the commission recommended that Macrae should receive an ex-gratia payment of £500 and Norwood received £250 for his contribution.

Users
Users of the grenade included:

See also
 British anti-invasion preparations of World War II
 No. 73 grenade
 No. 76 special incendiary grenade
 Blacker Bombard
 Smith Gun
 Northover Projector
 PIAT

Notes

References

Bibliography

External links

 Home Guard site
 The Home Guard Pocket Manual, by Capt. A. Southworth, M.B.E., pp 47–48: description of the sticky bomb, use and diagram.
 Imperial War Museum Collection Search: sticky bomb (search results)
H 30178 (photograph): Home Guardsmen training with the sticky bomb
 Manufacturing at Kay Brothers
 

World War II grenades of the United Kingdom
World War II infantry weapons of the United Kingdom
Anti-tank grenades
Hand grenades of the United Kingdom
Weapons and ammunition introduced in 1940